Sri Lanka is represented at the 2006 Commonwealth Games in Melbourne by a 67-member strong contingent comprising xx sportspersons and xx officials.

Medals

Gold
 Chinthana Vidanage - men's 62 kg category (first weightlifting gold medal for Sri Lanka)

Commonwealth Games
Nations at the 2006 Commonwealth Games
2006